Sporobolus spicatus, also known as salt grass, is a halophyte.

Distribution
This bunchgrass is distributed: 
in dryer parts of Africa such as Namibia, as a well known common plant in the western desert of Egypt 
from the Mediterranean coast to South Africa 
from the Middle East southwest to Pakistan and India.

Description
Sporobolus spicatus is a perennial bunchgrass forming turfs near water and which has short, pointed flat blade leaves. It grows up to a maximum height of 40 cm and is distinguishable by a dark green colour.

References

spicatus
Halophytes
Bunchgrasses of Africa
Bunchgrasses of Asia
Flora of South Africa
Flora of North Africa
Flora of Western Asia
Grasses of India
Grasses of Pakistan
Flora of Egypt
Flora of Libya
Flora of Algeria
Flora of Morocco
Flora of Namibia
Flora of Yemen